Jackson Heights, Ohio may refer to:

 Jackson Heights, Jackson County, Ohio
 Jackson Heights, Jefferson County, Ohio